Asparagus virus 3 is a pathogenic plant virus in the family Alphaflexiviridae.

External links
ICTVdB - The Universal Virus Database: Asparagus virus 3
Family Groups - The Baltimore Method

Potexviruses
Viral plant pathogens and diseases